Epacris sparsa, is a small upright shrub with creamy-white flowers, elliptic to egg-shaped leaves and reddish new growth. It  is endemic to New South Wales with a restricted distribution.

Description
The brown branchlets are covered in fine, soft, short hairs and the new growth a reddish colour. Flowering occurs from May to September.

Taxonomy and naming
This species was first formally described in 1810 by Robert Brown and the description was published in Prodromus florae Novae Hollandiae et insulae Van-Diemen, exhibens characteres plantarum quas annis 1802-1805. The specific epithet (sparsa) is from the Latin sparsus meaning "scattered". In Alan Fairley's book "Seldom Seen -Rare Plants of Greater Sydney" he states "When Brown made the first collection, it had finished flowering, so he got the wrong impression. In fact, plants often bear many flowers".

Distribution and habitat
This  species has a restricted distribution only known from four populations, Faulconbridge, Grose River area, north of Richmond and Avoca Vale Reserve.  It is found growing in shady, rocky, wet situations in nutrient poor clay or sandy soils. It tolerates periods of high rainfall.

Conservation status
Epacris sparsa is listed as "vulnerable" under the Australian Government Environment Protection and Biodiversity Conservation Act 1999 and the New South Wales Biodiversity Conservation Act 2016.

References 

sparsa
Ericales of Australia
Flora of New South Wales
Plants described in 1810
Taxa named by Robert Brown (botanist, born 1773)